Trochomodulus is a genus of small sea snails, marine gastropod molluscs in the family Modulidae.

Species
 Trochomodulus calusa (Petuch, 1988)
 Trochomodulus carchedonius (Lamarck, 1822)
 Trochomodulus catenulatus (Philippi, 1849)

References

 Landau B., Vermeij G. K. & Reich S. (2014). Classification of the Modulidae (Caenogastropoda, Cerithioidea), with new genera and new fossil species from the Neogene of tropical America and Indonesia. Basteria. 78(1-3): 1-29.

External links
 

Modulidae